Michael Allardice (born 19 October 1991) is a New Zealand rugby union player who currently plays as a lock for  in New Zealand's domestic Mitre 10 Cup and the  in the international Super Rugby competition.

Early career

Born in the rural town of Taihape in the centre of New Zealand's north island in the Manawatū-Whanganui region, he moved to the area's biggest town, Palmerston North for school and attended Palmerston North Boys' High School where he played first XV rugby.   Upon graduation, he moved south to Christchurch to study for a Bachelor of Commerce degree, majoring in marketing and business management at the University of Canterbury which he completed in 3 years.

Senior career

In 2013 after completing his university studies he headed north to join the Hawke's Bay Magpies.

The 2016 New Zealand domestic season was a write-off for both him and his team, as injury meant he was ruled out of the entire campaign and the Magpies' stay in the Mitre 10 Cup Premiership proved to be a brief one as they were relegated to the Championship for 2017 after recording only 2 wins all season.

Super Rugby

A pre-season training stint with the  ahead of the 2014 Super Rugby season opened up some doors for him in the franchise and he was subsequently named in their squad for 2015. Despite, injury problems in the latter half of 2016, he was retained in the squad for the 2017 Super Rugby season.

In August 2016, Allardice made headlines in New Zealand for alleged homophobic abuse of a gay couple during a post season team bonding at a pub and public swimming facility at Okoroire Hot Springs near Tirau in the Waikato. He later made a public apology. The incident came on the heels of a study that found more young Kiwi men hide their sexuality on the playing field than in any other country.

In 2019, Allardice resigned with the Chiefs.

International

Allardice was a New Zealand Schools representative in 2009 and also turned out for New Zealand Universities during his time at the University of Canterbury.

Career Honours

Canterbury

Mitre 10 Cup Premiership - 2012

Hawke's Bay

Mitre 10 Cup Championship - 2015

Super Rugby Statistics

References

1991 births
Living people
New Zealand rugby union players
Rugby union locks
Chiefs (rugby union) players
Canterbury rugby union players
Hawke's Bay rugby union players
People educated at Palmerston North Boys' High School
University of Canterbury alumni
Toyota Verblitz players
Rugby union players from Manawatū-Whanganui